Witoldów may refer to the following places:
Witoldów, Kutno County in Łódź Voivodeship (central Poland)
Witoldów, Biała Podlaska County in Lublin Voivodeship (east Poland)
Witoldów, Chełm County in Lublin Voivodeship (east Poland)
Witoldów, Łask County in Łódź Voivodeship (central Poland)
Witoldów, Gostynin County in Masovian Voivodeship (east-central Poland)
Witoldów, Radom County in Masovian Voivodeship (east-central Poland)
Witoldów, Sochaczew County in Masovian Voivodeship (east-central Poland)
Witoldów, Greater Poland Voivodeship (west-central Poland)